Bocicoiu Mare ( or Újbocskó) is a commune in Maramureș County, Maramureș, Romania. It lies 9 kilometres east of Sighetu Marmației, across the Tisza River from Velykyy Bychkiv, Ukraine.

Villages
The commune is composed of four villages: Bocicoiu Mare, Crăciunești, Lunca la Tisa and Tisa.

History

The village was first mentioned in 1373, by the name Boshko. Its name derives from a Slavic word meaning "bull". From 1556 it belonged to the Báthory family. By 1711 a mansion already stood here. After the failed revolution led by Francis II Rákóczi, Germans settled down in the area.

The village was known as Németbocskó ("German Bocskó", later called Újbocskó or "New Bocskó") and was united with two villages (Nagybocskó and Kisbocskó; "Greater" and "Smaller" Bocskó) across the river, forming a greater village called Nagybocskó. This village had thus three parts: Újbocskó, which forms today's Bocicoiu Mare, and Kisbocskó and Nagybocskó, which form today's Velykyy Bychkiv.

Lunca la Tisa was part of the former Hungarian village of Lonka, which was cut into two parts after the World Wars, when the Tisza River became a natural border between Romania and Ukraine. Its Ukrainian half forms the village of Luh (Луг).

Demographics
In 1910 the village had 5,955 inhabitants: 3,078 Ruthenians, 1,646 Hungarians, and 1,177 Germans. It belonged to the Hungarian county of Máramaros. After World War I, the village was split in two, and the river became a natural border of the two countries, with Velykyy Bychkiv in Czechoslovakia. In 1940, both halves became again part of Hungary, before the former split was reinstated at the end of World War II; however, due to new border arrangements, Velykyy Bychkiv became part of the Ukrainian SSR in 1945.

At the 2011 census, 53.2% of inhabitants were Ukrainians, 39.6% Romanians and 6.8% Hungarians. At the 2002 census, 76.8% were Romanian Orthodox, 8.5% Roman Catholic, 8.2% Greek-Catholic, and 4.7% stated they belonged to another religion.

Main sights

 Its Roman Catholic church was built in the 14th century in Gothic style architecture, but it was rebuilt several times and lost its Gothic elements.

References

This article is based on a translation of the equivalent article from the Hungarian Wikipedia on 19 February 2007.

Communes in Maramureș County
Localities in Romanian Maramureș
Ukrainian communities in Romania